Halichoeres chrysotaenia, common name Indian Ocean pinstriped wrasse, is a wrasse native to the Indo-West Pacific. It inhabits waters off rocky shorelines but seems to avoid areas of rich coral growth.

References

chrysotaenia
Fish of Thailand
Taxa named by Pieter Bleeker
Fish described in 1855
Taxobox binomials not recognized by IUCN